A Formula One Grand Prix is a sporting event which takes place over three days (usually Friday to Sunday), with a series of practice and qualifying sessions prior to the race on Sunday. Current regulations provide for two free practice sessions on Friday, a morning practice session and an afternoon qualifying session held on Saturday, and the race held on Sunday afternoon or evening, though the structure of the weekend has changed numerous times over the history of the sport. Historically, the Monaco Grand Prix held practice on Thursday rather than Friday, and the whole schedule for the Las Vegas Grand Prix is brought forward by one day.

At most Formula One race weekends, other events such as races in other Fédération Internationale de l'Automobile (FIA) series, such as Formula 2 or Formula 3, are held.

Free practice 
Since 2006, three free practice sessions (often abbreviated to FP1, FP2, and FP3) are held before the race. The first is held on Friday morning and the second on Friday afternoon, while the third session is on Saturday morning. From , all sessions last for one hour, prior to this the Friday sessions were 90 minutes in length and the Saturday session was one hour long.

Private tests are now heavily restricted, but a third driver (such as a reserve, test, or junior driver) is permitted to take part in the first Friday free practice session in the place of a regular driver.

Second practice session for the Bahrain, Singapore and Abu Dhabi Grands Prix takes place in the evening as these races are run at night.

Qualifying 

A qualifying session is held before each race to determine the order cars will be lined up in at the start of the race, with the fastest qualifier starting at the front and the slowest at the back.

Historical methods 
Traditionally before , qualifying was split into two one-hour sessions; the first was held on Friday (Thursday at Monaco) afternoon from 13:00 to 14:00 local time, with the second held on Saturday afternoon at the same time. The fastest time set by each driver from either session counted towards their final grid position. Each driver was limited to twelve laps per qualifying session.

In 1996, qualifying was amended with the Friday qualifying session abolished in a favour for a single qualifying session held on Saturday afternoon. As previously, each driver was limited to twelve laps with the inclusion of a 107% rule to exclude drivers with slow lap times. This was calculated by using the time of the driver on pole position and adding on 7% to create a cut-off time. This format remained until the conclusion of the 2002 season.

In 2003, the Friday running order was determined with the leader of the Drivers' Championship heading out first. The Saturday running order was determined by times set in Friday afternoon qualifying with the fastest heading out last and the slowest running first. No refuelling was allowed between the start of Saturday qualifying and the start of the race, so drivers qualified on race fuel. The lap times from the Friday afternoon session did not determine the grid order.

In 2004, the Friday session was moved to Saturday. The running order for the first session was now based on the result of the previous race. At first both sessions were held back-to-back, but the first session was later moved earlier in the day.

At the start of 2005, the sessions were held on Saturday afternoon and Sunday morning. Lap times from both sessions were counted to give the overall aggregate position. From the 2005 European Grand Prix onwards, the Sunday morning session was dropped for a single run on Saturday afternoon having proved unpopular with drivers, teams and broadcasters. The running order was the reverse of the previous race result.

Current format 
Since , qualifying takes place on Saturday afternoon in a three-stage "knockout" system. One hour is dedicated to determining the grid order, divided into three periods with short intermissions between them.

Currently, the first qualifying period (Q1) is eighteen minutes long, with all twenty cars competing. At the end of Q1, the five slowest drivers are eliminated from further qualification rounds, and fill positions sixteen to twenty on the grid based on their fastest lap time. Any driver attempting to set a qualifying time when the period ends is permitted to finish their lap, though no new laps may be started once the chequered flag is shown. After a short break, the second period (Q2) (15 minutes long) begins, with fifteen cars on the circuit. At the end of Q2, the five slowest drivers are once again eliminated, filling grid positions eleven to fifteen. Finally, the third qualifying period (Q3) features the ten fastest drivers from the second period. The drivers are issued a new set of soft tyres and have twelve minutes to set a qualifying time, which will determine the top ten positions on the grid. The driver who sets the fastest qualifying time is said to be on pole position, the grid position that offers the best physical position from which to start the race.

Drivers may complete as many laps as they choose within the permitted qualifying session's time. As of the 2022 season, all drivers are permitted to start the race on the tyre of their choice regardless of their grid position, whereas previously it was required for the drivers starting in the top 10 grid positions to start on the same tyre as the one that they set their fastest lap time within the second qualifying session.

Generally, a driver will leave the pits and drive around the track in order to get to the start/finish line (the out-lap). Having crossed the line, they will attempt to achieve the quickest time around the circuit that they can in one or more laps (the flying lap or hot lap). This is the lap time which is used in calculating grid position. Finally, the driver will continue back around the track and re-enter the pit lane (the in-lap). However, this is merely strategy, and no teams are obliged by the rules to follow this formula; drivers may elect to set several flying laps before returning to the pits.

For the first two races of the 2016 season, a modified format was used where drivers were eliminated during the sessions rather than just at the end and only eight drivers progressed to the final session. Qualifying reverted to the previous format from the third race of the season onwards.

Qualifying requirements 
The regulations place a limit of twenty-six entries for the championship. At some periods in the history of Formula One the number of cars entered for each race has exceeded the number permitted, which historically would vary from race to race according to the circuit used; Monaco, for example, for many years allowed only twenty cars to compete because of the restricted space available. The slowest cars excess to the circuit limit would not qualify for the race and would be listed as 'Did Not Qualify' (DNQ) in race results.

Historical pre-qualifying
There had been pre-qualifying sessions in the late 1970s, but during the late 1980s and early 1990s the number of cars attempting to enter each race was as high as thirty-nine for some races. Because of the dangers of having so many cars on the track at the same time, pre-qualifying sessions were re-introduced for the teams with the worst record over the previous twelve months, including any new teams. Usually, only the four fastest cars from this session were then allowed into the qualifying session proper, where thirty cars competed for twenty-six places on the starting grid for the race. The slowest cars from the pre-qualifying session were listed in race results as 'Did Not Pre-Qualify' (DNPQ). Pre-qualifying was discontinued after 1992 when many small teams withdrew from the sport.

107% rule

As the number of cars entered in the world championship fell below twenty-six, a situation arose in which any car entered would automatically qualify for the race, no matter how slowly it had been driven. If a car's qualifying time was not within 7% of the pole sitter's time, that car would not qualify for the race, unless at the discretion of the race stewards for a situation such as a rain-affected qualifying session. For example, if the pole-sitter's time was one minute and forty seconds, any car eligible for racing had to set a time within one minute and forty-seven seconds.

The 107% rule was removed since the FIA's rules indicated previously that 24 cars could take the start of a Formula One race, and a minimum of twenty cars had to enter a race. In , the qualifying procedure changed to a single-lap system, rendering the rule inoperable. However, there were concerns about the pace of the new teams in the 2010 season. As the qualifying procedure had been changed since the 2006 season to a three-part knockout system, the rule could now be reintroduced. As such, the 107% rule was reintroduced in the 2011 Formula One season. Currently, cars eliminated in Q1 have to be within 7% of the fastest Q1 time in order to qualify for the race.

Since the rule was re-introduced, only twice have cars failed to qualify for a Grand Prix—both times involving Hispania Racing cars and both times occurring at the Australian Grand Prix, namely in 2011 (Vitantonio Liuzzi and Narain Karthikeyan) and 2012 (Karthikeyan and Pedro de la Rosa). At their discretion, stewards may permit a driver who fails to set a qualifying time within the desired 107% span; for example, at the 2018 British Grand Prix, Lance Stroll and Brendon Hartley both failed to set times within 107%, but were permitted to race on the grounds of satisfactory lap times in free practice. After eleven drivers failed to set satisfactory Q1 times at the 2016 Hungarian Grand Prix due to inclement weather, the regulations were amended in 2018 so that wet sessions were not subject to the 107% rule.

Grid penalties 
Drivers or cars may be issued penalties against their starting positions, commonly for exceeding component limits, or sporting offences in free practice, qualifying, or a previous race. This can lead to the starting grid being significantly different from the qualifying order.

Sprint 

During the 2021 Formula One World Championship, Formula One trialed a "sprint qualifying" system at three Grands Prix – Britain, Italy, and São Paulo – in which the grid for the race on Sunday was determined by a 100 km sprint on Saturday. On a race weekend with sprint qualifying, the sessions on Friday instead of regular two practice sessions consisted of one practice session and a traditional qualifying session, which was limited to soft tyres and which set the grid for sprint qualifying. Only the winner of the sprint qualifying was considered to have taken pole position for the main Grand Prix, and they received a trophy similar to the pole position trophy awarded at other race weekends. The top three finishers in sprint qualifying in 2021 received World Championship points in a 3–2–1 scoring system. Formula One initially planned to extend the use of the format from the three events in 2021 to six events in the 2022 Formula One World Championship. McLaren Racing CEO Zak Brown said these plans could be under threat with teams unable to agree on whether the sports budget cap should be increased (and if so  by how much) to cover the cost of extra sprints.

On 3 February 2022, it was reported that Formula One had offered a compromise plan to hold three sprints in 2022 (the same number as held in 2021) to try and ensure the format would not be dropped entirely from the 2022 championship. For 2022 season, sprint qualifying was renamed to sprint. The weekend format remained unchanged from 2021 and was run at the Emilia Romagna, Austrian, and São Paulo Grands Prix with points now awarded to the top eight finishers rather than the top three finishers as was the case in 2021. Unlike the 2021 season, the driver who set the fastest time in qualifying was credited as the official polesitter (unless penalised), with the winner of the sprint continuing to have the right to start the race from the first-place grid position. As of late 2022, the idea of making the sprint an entirely 'standalone' in 2023 was being considered, meaning that the outcome of the sprint race would no longer set the grid for the main race.

Race 

The race itself is held on Sunday afternoon, with the exception of night races at Singapore, Bahrain, and Saudi Arabia and a day/night race for the season finale in Abu Dhabi. The last race not to take place on a Sunday was the 1985 South African Grand Prix, which took place on a Saturday.

Race start 
Thirty minutes prior to race time, the cars take to the track for any number of warm-up laps (formally known as reconnaissance laps), provided they pass through the pit lane and not the grid, after which they assemble on the starting grid in the order they qualified. At the hour of the race, a green light signifies the beginning of the relatively slow formation lap during which all cars parade around the course doing a final tyre warmup and system checks. The cars then return to their assigned grid spot for the standing race start. The starting light system, which consists of five pairs of lights mounted above the start/finish line, then lights up each pair at one-second intervals. Once all five pairs are illuminated, after a random length of time (one to nine seconds), the red lights are turned off by the race director, at which point the race starts. The race length is defined as the smallest number of complete laps that exceeds 305 kilometres (the Monaco Grand Prix is the sole exception with a race length of 78 laps / 260.5 km), though occasionally some races are truncated due to special circumstances. The race can not exceed two hours in length—if this interval is reached, the race will be ended at the end of the next full lap—unless the race is halted by a red flag, in which case the total time including the red flag stoppage must not exceed three hours, and the total time excluding the red flag stoppage may not exceed two hours. Although, at the 2021 Belgian Grand Prix, the three hour countdown was stopped with force majeure being cited.

Pit stops 

Each driver is also required to use two different types of dry compound during a dry race, and so must make a mandatory pit stop. Timing pit stops with reference to other cars is crucial—if they are following another car but are unable to pass, the driver may try to stay on the track as long as possible, or pit immediately, as newer tyres are usually faster. Prior to the 2010 season, drivers used to make pit stops for fuel more than once during a race, as the cars on average traveled two kilometres per litre (approximately five miles per gallon). Nowadays this figure is higher, due to changes in engines from 2014, and as a result refuelling has been forbidden during a race since . If a driver starts the race using intermediate or wet tyres, they are not mandated to make a pit stop.

Podium ceremony 
At the end of the race, the first, second and third-placed drivers take their places on a podium, where they stand as the national anthem of the race winner's home country and that of their team is played. Dignitaries from the country hosting the race then present trophies to the drivers and a constructor's trophy to a representative from the winner's team, and the winning drivers spray champagne and are interviewed. The three drivers then go to a media room for a press conference where they answer questions in English and their native languages.

Points system

Historical methods 
Historically, the races were scored on the basis of a five-place tally: i.e. via an 8–6–4–3–2 scoring system, with the holder of the fastest race lap also receiving a bonus point. In 1961, the scoring was revised to give the winner nine points instead of eight, and the single point awarded for fastest lap was given for sixth place for the first time the previous year. In 1991, the points system was again revised to give the victor 10 points, with all other scorers recording the same 6–4–3–2–1 result. In 2003, the FIA further revised the scoring system to apportion points to the first eight classified finishers (a classified finisher must complete 90% of race distance) on a 10–8–6–5–4–3–2–1 basis.

At certain points between 1950 and 1990, drivers' points for the season would be tallied based on their best results across the World Championship, which varied from 4 to 11 in a season, and during the late 1960s and 1970s points would be tallied based on their best results from each half of the season, which varied from four to seven. This was done in order to equalise the footings of teams which may not have had the wherewithal to compete in all events. With the advent of the Concorde Agreements, this practice has been discontinued, though it did feature prominently in several world championships through the 1970s and 1980s, primarily in 1988 when Alain Prost had 105 points to Ayrton Senna's 94, but due to only the best 11 results counting towards the World Championship, Senna won, with the final points tally being 90–87.

Current system 

Points are awarded to drivers and teams based on where they finish in a race. The winner receives 25 points, the second-place finisher 18 points, with 15, 12, 10, 8, 6, 4, 2 and 1 points for positions 3 through 10, respectively. One additional point is awarded to the driver and team with the fastest lap of the race, if they finish in the top 10 positions. In a dead heat, prizes and points are added together and shared equally for all those drivers who tie. The winner of the annual championship is the driver (or team, for the Constructors' Championship) with the most points. If the number of points is the same, priority is given to the driver with more wins. If that is the same it will be decided on the most second places and so on.

Notes

References

External links
 Current Formula One Sporting Regulations – 2020. Published by the FIA on 23 November 2020.
 Current Formula One Technical Regulations – 2020. Published by the FIA on 19 June 2020.